was a late Heian period general, who fought alongside his brothers Minamoto no Yoritomo and Minamoto no Yoshitsune at a number of battles of the Genpei War. He was the sixth son of Minamoto no Yoshitomo.

Early life 
As children, he and his brothers Yoritomo and Yoshitsune were spared by Taira no Kiyomori in 1160, following the death of their father, Minamoto no Yoshitomo, after their mother Tokiwa became Kiyomori's concubine.

Genpei War 
Noriyori seemingly disappears from any record until 1180, when he served his brother Yoritomo in Kamakura. Beginning in 1184, four years into the Genpei War, he was sent out from Kamakura by Yoritomo, and made his way to the Taira strongholds of Shikoku. Noriyori helped defeat the wayward Minamoto no Yoshinaka, his cousin, at the Second Battle of the Uji and the Battle of Awazu, before moving on to play a central role in the Battle of Ichi-no-Tani. The Taira were pushed back, and the war fell into a lull for about six months, during which Noriyori returned to Kyoto.

Noriyori was sent out once more, in September 1184, to secure the provinces of the Chūgoku region, and then to move on into Kyūshū. He played a major role in the Battle of Kojima. However, attempting to push further, he ran into difficulties of a lack of supplies, and the fact that the Inland Sea was controlled by his enemies. He wrote to his brother in Kamakura, and was told that supplies were on the way, but that the Taira were watching, so any shipments had to be done very carefully. Noriyori finally managed to get rice, other supplies, and a handful of war junks from a magnate in Suo Province. He moved on into Kyūshū as planned, and remained there, playing no role in the decisive Battle of Dan-no-ura.

After the Genpei War was over, Noriyori returned to Kamakura, where he was rewarded by Yoritomo for his services. However, there was now a feud for dominance of the clan between Yoritomo and Yoshitsune. Yoritomo ordered Noriyori to arrest their brother; after unsuccessfully trying to convince Yoritomo to change his mind, Noriyori simply disobeyed outright.

Death 
In May 1193, when Yoritomo held a grand hunt on Mount Fuji, an incident occurred in which two brothers of the Soga clan killed Kudo Suketsune, an enemy of their father. A rumor spread that Yoritomo had been killed. Yoritomo's wife, Hōjō Masako, was worried, but Noriyori comforted her, assuring her that even if Yoritomo were killed, he would be there for her and for the clan. These words caused Yoritomo to doubt his brother, who confined Noriyori to Izu Province. 

In 1193, Yoritomo had Noriyori killed on charges of conspiracy.

Family
 Father: Minamoto no Yoshitomo
 Mother: Iwata no Tsubone

See also 

 The Tale of Heike

References

West, C.E. & F.W. Seal (2003). http://www.samurai-archives.com/chronol.html Chronology: Minamoto Noriyori. Accessed 8 Dec 2004.
www.samurai-archives.com 

1150 births
1193 deaths
Minamoto clan
People of Heian-period Japan
People of Kamakura-period Japan